Mill Creek Township is one of the twelve townships of Williams County, Ohio, United States.  The 2000 census found 935 people in the township, 630 of whom lived in the unincorporated portions of the township.

Geography
Located in the northeastern corner of the county along the Michigan state line, it borders the following townships:
Wright Township, Hillsdale County, Michigan - north
Gorham Township, Fulton County - east
Franklin Township, Fulton County - southeast
Brady Township - south
Jefferson Township - southwest
Madison Township - west
Amboy Township, Hillsdale County, Michigan - northwest

The census-designated place of Alvordton is located in central Mill Creek Township. The township lies within the Toledo Strip, a contested ribbon of land over which Ohio and Michigan came to blows in an 1835–36 confrontation known as the Toledo War.

Name and history
Mill Creek Township was organized in 1835, and named after Mill Creek. Statewide, the only other Mill Creek Township is located in Coshocton County, although there is a Millcreek Township in Union County and formerly a Millcreek Township in Hamilton County.

Government
The township is governed by a three-member board of trustees, who are elected in November of odd-numbered years to a four-year term beginning on the following January 1. Two are elected in the year after the presidential election and one is elected in the year before it. There is also an elected township fiscal officer, who serves a four-year term beginning on April 1 of the year after the election, which is held in November of the year before the presidential election. Vacancies in the fiscal officership or on the board of trustees are filled by the remaining trustees.

References

External links
County website

Townships in Williams County, Ohio
Townships in Ohio